This is a list of foreign ministers of Antigua and Barbuda.

1981–1991: Lester Bird
1991: Vere Bird
1991–2004: Lester Bird
2004–2005: Harold Lovell
2005–2014: Baldwin Spencer
2014–2018: Charles Fernandez
2018-present: Paul Chet Greene

Sources
Rulers.org – Foreign ministers A–D

Foreign
Foreign Ministers
Politicians